Microschemobrycon is a genus of characins, in the family Characidae, from South America, with seven currently described species.

It is a neotropical genus of ray-finned fishes distributed in the Amazon Basin to Mato Grosso and Paraná Basin, Paraguay, to the Rio de la Plata. With such geographical spread is not surprising that there is adaptation to different ecosystems, which has resulted in variations in size, color, eating habits, and types of water inhabited.

Species
The genus consists of the following species:

 Microschemobrycon callops J. E. Böhlke, 1953
 Microschemobrycon casiquiare J. E. Böhlke, 1953
 Microschemobrycon elongatus Géry, 1973
 Microschemobrycon geisleri Géry, 1973
 Microschemobrycon guaporensis C. H. Eigenmann, 1915
 Microschemobrycon melanotus (C. H. Eigenmann, 1912)
 Microschemobrycon meyburgi Meinken, 1975

References
 

Characidae
Fish of South America
Taxa named by Carl H. Eigenmann